Sheik Umar Khan (6 March 1975 – 29 July 2014) was the chief Sierra Leonean doctor attempting to curb the country's Ebola outbreak in 2014.

The virologist is credited with treating over a hundred patients before succumbing to the virus himself. He was recognized as a "national hero" by Sierra Leone's Health Ministry. Khan had long worked with Lassa fever, a disease that kills over 5,000 a year in Africa. He had expanded his clinic to accept Ebola patients. Sierra Leone's president, Ernest Bai Koroma, celebrated Khan as a "national hero". He had a habit of hugging the cured Ebola patients that were leaving his ward, to lift their spirits.

Khan made contact with the Korle-Bu Teaching Hospital in 2010 when he came to Ghana to do his Residency. He was offered admission into the Ghana College of Physicians and Surgeons to undertake a 3-year residency training programme in internal medicine. As part of the training, he was posted to the Department of Medicine of the Korle-Bu Teaching Hospital.

Death 
Khan was very meticulous in donning personal protective equipment as he treated patients. Believing the virus unable to be transmitted in an airborne fashion, he worked fearlessly with Ebola virus patients. Despite observing recommended protocols, Khan was infected by the virus and died on 29 July 2014 in a facility run by Medecins Sans Frontieres. He was not offered a dose of the experimental drug ZMapp though one was available. Sierra Leonean president Ernest Bai Koroma had been due to visit his treatment center the following week.

Awards and honors 
 On 18 December 2014, Khan was named one of Nature's 10 "people who mattered" of 2014, along with Maryam Mirzakhani, Radhika Nagpal, and others.
 In 2019, asteroid 6781 Sheikhumarrkhan, discovered by American astronomer Henry E. Holt at Palomar Observatory in 1990, was named in his memory. The official  was published by the Minor Planet Center on 27 August 2019 and revised on 25 March 2021.

References 
 

2014 deaths
1975 births
Sierra Leonean virologists
Deaths from Ebola